The Barrie Bus Terminal, also called the Barrie Transit Terminal or Barrie Bus Depot, is an intercity and municipal bus station in Barrie, Ontario, Canada. It serves as one of five hubs for the local Barrie Transit system as well as the city's stop on intercity bus routes operated by GO Transit, and Ontario Northland. The terminal was built in 1991 to replace the old terminal across the street built in 1956. The building also houses some administration offices for Barrie Transit.

On January 23, 2017, the Barrie City Council unanimously approved plans to turn the terminal building into a public market to attract tourists and residents to the city's waterfront. Local bus services will continue to use the building as a hub with new platforms built closer to the street, but all intercity bus services will be relocated to the nearby Allandale Waterfront GO Station.  Construction of this project has yet to begin; the new Allandale hub is expected to open in spring 2023.

Platform assignments
Platform 1: 1A Georgian Mall - Northbound, 1B Welham - Southbound
Platform 2: 7A Grove - Northbound, 8B Essa - Southbound
Platform 3: 100A Red Express - Clockwise, 100B Blue Express - Counter Clockwise, 100C Red Express - Clockwise, 100D Blue Express - Counter Clockwise
Platform 4: 4A East Bayfield - Northbound, 4B South Go - Southbound
Platform 5: 5A Edgehill - Westbound, 8B Crosstown - Northbound
Platform 6: 6A Letitia - Clockwise
Platform 7: 3B Painswick - Southbound, 6B College - Counter Clockwise
Platform 8: 2B Park Place - Southbound, 8A RVH - Northbound
Platform 9-12: Intercity Buses
Platform 13: 7B Bear Creek - Southbound, 8A Yonge - Southbound

References

External links

1956 establishments in Ontario
Buildings and structures in Barrie
Bus stations in Ontario
GO Transit bus terminals
Transport in Barrie
Transport infrastructure completed in 1956